Einar Vallbaum (born 9 October 1959) is an Estonian economist and politician. He was a member of the XII and XIII Riigikogu.

Valbaum was born and raised in Rakvere. In 2007, he graduated with a degree in business management from Mainor Business School in Tallinn. He was a member of the Estonian Centre Party from 2002 until 2009, the Estonian Reform Party from 2010 until 2013, and the Union of Pro Patria and Res Publica since 2015.

References

Living people
1959 births
20th-century Estonian economists
Estonian Reform Party politicians
Isamaa politicians
Members of the Riigikogu, 2011–2015
Members of the Riigikogu, 2015–2019
People from Rakvere
21st-century Estonian economists